Lyna Khoudri (born 3 October 1992) is an Algerian-French actress. For her role in the Sofia Djama-directed film Les Bienheureux (2017), she won the Orizzonti Award for Best Actress at the 74th Venice International Film Festival. In 2020, for her role in Papicha, she won the Cesar Award for Most Promising Actress. She worked for several years for this role, with director Mounia Meddour, who also won the César Award for Best first feature Film in 2020. She portrays a student activist in Wes Anderson's ensemble film The French Dispatch (2021).

Early life 
Khoudri was born in 1992 in Algiers, Algeria, to a journalist father and a violinist mother. The family moved to Aubervilliers, France, as exiles following death threats due to the danger of her father's profession during the Algerian Civil War. Khoudri received her professional training at Théâtre national de la Colline.

Career 
In 2014, Khoudri received her first acting role in the French television series Josephine, Guardian Angel.

In 2019, she played Louna in the Canal+ miniseries Les Sauvages for several episodes. That year, she also played Nedjma in the film Papicha, about a young Algerian woman who uses fashion as cultural resistance during the Algerian Civil War.

For The French Dispatch, Khoudri's role is as a militant student activist and the girlfriend of Timothée Chalamet's character; their storyline centers on a student riot. Khoudri attended the premiere with Anderson, Chalamet, and other members of the cast at the 2021 Cannes Film Festival where the film competed in the official selection for the Palme d'Or.

Filmography

References

External links 

Living people
1992 births
People from Algiers
People from Aubervilliers
Algerian emigrants to France
Algerian film actresses
French film actresses
French people of Algerian descent
Most Promising Actress César Award winners
21st-century Algerian actresses
21st-century French actresses